Bongabon, officially the Municipality of Bongabon, is a 2nd class municipality in the province of Nueva Ecija, Philippines. According to the 2020 census, it has a population of 66,839 people.

Each barangay in Bongabon has its own fiesta. The town fiesta, celebrated annually on the 1st to 2nd week of April, is known as the Sibuyasan Onion Festival.

History
The Augustinian missionaries who preached Catholicism in Pampanga extended their outposts into what is now the province of Nueva Ecija by following the Rio Grande dela Pampanga. Thus, Santol (present day Barangay Santor) was part of Pantabangan and established in 1659. In 1760, Bongabon was named as a town and parish under the patronage of St. Francis of Assisi.

Bongabon was the first capital of Nueva Ecija.

Philippine Revolution under the Spanish Colonial Period
When the Philippine Revolution began on 1896 to 1898 against Spain. The Philippine Revolutionary and Republican troops with the aid of Katipunero rebels invaded the municipal town of Bongabon and fought the Spanish Colonial forces and started the Siege of Bongabon. The Filipino revolutionary troops and Katipunero rebel fighters captured the municipal town after the siege forcing the Spanish troops to retreat.

Philippine-American War and the American Colonial Period
With the outbreak of the Philippine–American War on 1899 to 1902, the town saw the arrival of American troops which fought the Filipino revolutionary troops and Katipuneros in the Battle of Bongabon on 1899. In the ensuing battle, the town was captured by the American troops.

Geography

Barangays
Bongabon is politically subdivided into barangays.

Climate

Demographics

Religion
The majority of the people of the municipality are Roman Catholic. The members of the Iglesia ni Cristo are growing in number and are second to the Catholics in membership. Other sects in the municipality are the Methodists, Iglesia ng Dios, Seventh-day Adventists, etc.

Economy

Tourism
Sibuyas Festival is celebrated as a form of thanksgiving every 10 April, and a way to promote and show their town as one of the largest producers of onion in Asia.
Ilog Jordan at Barangay Olivete - This place is a popular Lenten destination for people seeking spiritual rejuvenation and healing. 
Falls Deepsap at Barangay Labi - A good place to visit during summer, the falls offers a cold shimmering water perfect to beat heatwaves. Its water comes from the untainted Sierra Madre Mountain.
Mount Labi Peak at Barangay Labi.
The first leg of the UCI Gravel World Series was held in Bongabon, Nueva Ecija, Philippines on April 3, 2022.

Healthcare
Bongabon District Hospital, a government hospital located at Barangay Curva, Bongabon, Nueva Ecija

Education
Most are public schools from primary to secondary. Bongabon National High School is located at Barangay Sinipit, Bongabon, Nueva Ecija, Philippines. Many of the students are going to Cabanatuan to continue their college.

References

External links

Bongabon Web Services - Nueva Ecija
 [ Philippine Standard Geographic Code]
Philippine Census Information
Local Governance Performance Management System

Municipalities of Nueva Ecija
Populated places on the Pampanga River